Andrew Philps (April 7, 1857 – October 4, 1929) was a Canadian politician.

Born in Saginaw, Michigan, Philps was elected to the Legislative Assembly of Quebec for Huntingdon in a 1913 by-election. A Liberal, he was re-elected in 1916 and acclaimed in 1919. He was re-elected in 1923 and 1927.

References

1857 births
1929 deaths
American emigrants to Canada
Quebec Liberal Party MNAs
Politicians from Saginaw, Michigan
Anglophone Quebec people